The 11057 / 58 Mumbai Chhatrapati Shivaji Maharaj Terminus–Amritsar Junction Express is an Express train belonging to Indian Railways – Central Railway zone that runs between Chhatrapati Shivaji Maharaj Terminus &  in India.
It operates as train number 11057 from Chhatrapati Shivaji Maharaj Terminus to Amritsar Junction and as train number 11058 in the reverse direction, serving the states of Maharashtra, Madhya Pradesh, Uttar Pradesh, Rajasthan, Haryana, Delhi and Punjab.

It is one of three trains that connect Mumbai & Amritsar, the other trains being the 12903 / 04 Golden Temple Mail & 12925 / 26 Paschim Express. However the 12903 / 04 Golden Temple Mail & 12925 / 26 Paschim Express are operated by Western Railway and have a different routing.

Alongside the Punjab Mail, this train is one of the oldest trains running out of Bombay.

History

1905 was the year when Agra got direct connection to Delhi via Mathura Chord. Legendary Punjab Mail was diverted via Chord & Kashi Express was introduced as an Bombay Express train between Bombay and Delhi from 1 February 1907, numbered 27 Down (towards Delhi) and 30 Up (towards Bombay). For the first few years of its run, it only carried third class carriages and was popularly known as the Delhi Express.

From 1 September 1919, Delhi Express diverted to Allahabad & GUP Express commenced to connect Bombay to Delhi carrying passengers of all classes and with dining car. Through carriage to Lucknow was also added to the consist. This through carriage was detached at Jhansi, whence it was run through to Lucknow with a connecting train.

During this period, the Punjab Mail used to depart from Bombay shortly after noon and arrive at Delhi on the next night. This made it very inconvenient for conveying mail between Bombay and Delhi, as the mail had to be posted early at Bombay and detained overnight at Delhi. The Delhi express however, departed from Bombay late night and arrived at Delhi on the morning of the third day. This schedule was better suited for the mail service and consequently, from 1 January 1921, the Delhi express started carrying mail between Bombay and Delhi.

Between 1926 and 1930, due to the introduction of many new trains like the Frontier Mail and the Howrah–Lahore express, the Delhi express changed terminals several times. From 1 January 1926, the train started running through to Rawalpindi, over the tracks of the North Western railway. From 1 September of the same year, the run was extended to Peshawar, in competition to the BB&CIR's Frontier Mail which was also made into a regular train from the same day. The service was curtailed to Lahore from 1 September 1929 and extended back to Peshawar from 1 March 1930. Subsequently, the train was designated as 197 Down and 198 Up on the GIPR's tracks.

Between September 1929 and March 1930, it used to carry the –Lahore through carriages between Itarsi and Lahore. These carriages were run between Madras and Itarsi as the Grand Trunk Express.

Like many trains operating in North India, this train's services were disrupted during the partition of India in 1947. After several temporary alterations in its route and schedule, from 12 January 1948, it resumed regular operations between Bombay and Delhi. Later the same year, its run was extended to Amritsar.

Starting from the early 1950s, it started running through to Pathankot and was called the Pathankot Express, a name that is still used at many wayside stations today. From 1 April 1968, the train started terminating at Amritsar again. Since then, barring changes in terminals within Bombay ( the train operated from all major terminals in the Central Railway's jurisdiction in Bombay), the train's route and destination have remained unchanged.

Coaches

The 11057 / 58 Mumbai Chhatrapati Shivaji Maharaj Terminus–Amritsar Junction Express presently has 1 AC 2 tier, 4 AC 3 tier, 8 Sleeper Class, 2 General Unreserved, 1 Railway Mail Service coach & 2 SLR (Seating cum Luggage Rake) coaches. It does not have a pantry car.

As is customary with most train services in India, coach composition may be amended at the discretion of Indian Railways depending on demand.

Service

11057 Mumbai Chhatrapati Shivaji Maharaj Terminus–Amritsar Junction Express covers the distance of 2030 kilometres in 40 hours 45 mins (49.82 km/hr) & in 43 hours 20 mins as 11058 Amritsar Junction–Mumbai Chhatrapati Shivaji Maharaj Terminus Express (46.85 km/hr).

As the average speed of the train is below , as per Indian Railways rules, its fare does not include a Superfast surcharge.

Routing

The train also has 4 coaches for  city which are terminated from  towards Dhule.

Traction

Initially the train ran from Dadar Terminus & was later shifted to Lokmanya Tilak Terminus on 22 October 2012 as part of a plan to decongest Dadar Terminus. Later, from 1 June 2015, its terminal shifted to Chhatrapati Shivaji Maharaj Terminus.

Earlier a WCAM 3 would haul the train between Dadar Terminus / Lokmanya Tilak Terminus until , handing over to a Ghaziabad-based WAP-4 which would haul the train until  after which a Tughlakabad-based WDM-3A would power the train for the remainder of the journey.

With Central Railways progressively moving towards a complete changeover from DC to AC traction, it is now hauled by a Ghaziabad-based WAP-4, WAP-5 or a WAP-7  until  after which a Tughlakabad-based WDM-3A or WDP-3A powers the train for the remainder of the journey.

After 1 June 2015 it shifts to Chhatrapati Shivaji Maharaj Terminus for changing the Patliputra Express (previously Rajendranagar Express) to Lokmanya Tilak Terminus.

Timings

11057 Mumbai CSMT - Amritsar Express leaves Mumbai CSMT Everyday at 11:30PM to reach Amritsar on evening 04:15PM of Day 3 with a distance of 2047km and an average speed of 50kmph with a total journey time of 40 hours 45 minutes.

11058 Amritsar - Mumbai CSMT Express leaves Amritsar Everyday at 08:50AM to reach Mumbai CSMT at Midnight 12:05AM on Day 3 with a distance of 2047km and an average speed of 52kms with a total journey time of 39 hours 15 minutes.

Rake sharing

It shares its rakes with 22159/22160 Mumbai CSMT–Chennai Express.

References

External links

Transport in Mumbai
Transport in Amritsar
Express trains in India
Rail transport in Maharashtra
Rail transport in Madhya Pradesh
Rail transport in Uttar Pradesh
Rail transport in Haryana
Rail transport in Delhi